Bolohan is a Romanian/Moldovan surname. Notable people with the surname include:

 Mugur Bolohan (born 1976), Romanian football player
 Vadim Bolohan (born 1986), Moldovan football player

Romanian-language surnames
Surnames of Moldovan origin